Barry Samuel Broadfoot, CM (January 21, 1926 – November 28, 2003) was a Canadian journalist, interviewer and history writer born in Winnipeg, Manitoba.

History
Broadfoot's first job at 17 years old was as a cub reporter who had to go to the homes of men killed in action in World War II and obtain photographs to run along with their death notices. At 18, he joined the Canadian Army and spent the next two years in the infantry.

Broadfoot's historical research consisted of interviewing subjects, generally from across Canada, about their memories of their lives during specific historical periods such as the Great Depression and World War II.  Ten Lost Years, his first in this series of books, published in 1973, was an oral history of the experiences of people during the Great Depression.  He collected the experiences, via taped interviews, during the course of travelling across Canada four times, subsequent to leaving his position with the Vancouver Sun in 1971.  The collected interviews became the basis of Ten Lost Years, a play written by Jack Winter, with music by Cedric Smith.  The play, directed by George Luscombe, premiered in Toronto, toured Canada in 1974 and continues to be performed.

In 1997, he was made a Member of the Order of Canada, Canada's highest civilian honour.

In 1998, Broadfoot suffered a stroke, which blinded him and impaired his memory.  He died in Nanaimo, British Columbia, on November 28, 2003.

Selected bibliography
 Ten Lost Years 1973 (Doubleday)
 Six War Years 1975
 The Pioneer Years 1976
 Years of Sorrow, Years of Shame 1977
 My Own Years 1983
 The Veterans' Years 1985
 The Immigrant Years. Douglas & McIntyre, Vancouver 1986
 Next-Year Country 1988
 Ordinary Russians 1989

References

External links
 TERASEN LIFETIME ACHIEVEMENT AWARD profile

1926 births
2003 deaths
Journalists from Manitoba
Members of the Order of Canada
University of Manitoba alumni
Writers from Winnipeg
Oral historians